Massachusetts Institute of Technology's intercollegiate sports teams, called the MIT Engineers, compete mostly in NCAA Division III. It has won 22 Team National Championships, 42 Individual National Championships. MIT is the all-time Division III leader in producing Academic All-Americas (302) and rank second across all NCAA Divisions. MIT Athletes won 13 Elite 90 awards and ranks first among NCAA Division III programs, and third among all divisions. Most of the school's sports compete in the New England Women's and Men's Athletic Conference (NEWMAC), with sports not sponsored by the NEWMAC housed in several other conferences. Men's volleyball competes in the single-sport United Volleyball Conference. One MIT sport, women's rowing, competes in Division I in the Eastern Association of Women's Rowing Colleges (EAWRC). Men's water polo, a sport in which the NCAA holds a single national championship for all three of its divisions, competes in the Collegiate Water Polo Association (CWPA) alongside Division I and Division II members. Three sports compete outside NCAA governance: men's rowing competes in the Eastern Association of Rowing Colleges (EARC), sailing in the New England Intercollegiate Sailing Association of ICSA and squash in the College Squash Association. In April 2009, budget cuts led to MIT's eliminating eight of its 41 sports, including the mixed men's and women's teams in alpine skiing and pistol; separate teams for men and women in ice hockey and gymnastics; and men's programs in golf and wrestling.

Mascot 
The beaver, the "nature's engineer" was adopted as mascot at the annual dinner of the Technology Club of New York on January 17, 1914 by a group of MIT alumni. The late President Richard Maclaurin formally accepted the proposal, and at this dinner a group of beavers shown in natural surroundings was presented to the Institute. The beaver has since been named TIM as MIT spelled backwards. Thus, Tim the Beaver (or MIT the Beaver) was born. 

Lester Gardner, a member of the Class of 1898, provided the following justification: "The beaver not only typifies the Tech, but his habits are particularly our own. The beaver is noted for his engineering and mechanical skills and habits of industry. His habits are nocturnal. He does his best work in the dark."

Nickname and song 
The initial MIT football team was nicknamed the Techmen. After being discontinued in 1901 and self-reinstated by a group of students in 1978, the team called themselves the Engineers, which then become tradition until now. The team also revived the old fighting song, now dubbed as "The Beaver Calls". The lyric reads: 

I'm a beaver, you're a beaver, we are beavers all.

And when we get together, we do the beaver call.

e to the u, du / dx, e to the x, dx

Cosine, secant, tangent, sine; 

3.14159

Integral, radical, mu dv

Slapstick, slide rule, MIT!

GO TECH!

NCAA championships

Team

Individual

Individual teams

Ice hockey
MIT's men's ice hockey team was one of the earliest collegiate hockey programs in the United States. It "was organized in the winter of 1899 to introduce the Canadian game of Hockey in the Institute". The team has played almost continually since.

Facilities 
Zesiger sports and fitness center — Squash, Swimming and Diving, Water Polo teams
Alumni Pool — Swimming and Diving
Wang Fitness Center — Squash
Johnson Athletic Center — Fencing, Tennis, Track and Field teams
duPont's Athletic Center — Basketball, Fencing, Rifle, Volleyball 
J.B. Carr Tennis Bubble — Men and Women's Tennis (indoor) 
duPont Tennis Courts — Men and Women's Tennis (outdoor) 
Rockwell Cage — Basketball and Volleyball 
Henry G. Steinbrenner '27 Stadium — Football, Men's Lacrosse, Soccer, Outdoor Track and Field
Bob and Eveline Roberts P'10 Field — Lacrosse 
Jack Barry Field — Field Hockey, Women's Lacrosse  
Fran O'Brien Field — Baseball 
Briggs Field — Softball
Walter C. Wood Sailing Pavilion — Sailings
Harold W. Pierce Boathouse — Rowing.

References

External links